A is the debut studio album by Cass McCombs. It was released on May 20, 2003, via Monitor Records.

Track listing

Personnel

Cass McCombs (Composer, Primary Artist)
Chris Cohen (Guitar)
Anthony Lukens (Organ)
Matt Popieluch (Electric Piano)
Jason Quever (Drums, Engineering)
Luke Top (Bass)
Brian DeRan (Cover Art)
Dutch Germ (Artwork)
Trevor Shimizu (Artwork)
JJ Golding (Mastering)

References

External links
Cass McCombs (official site)

2003 debut albums
Cass McCombs albums